Jackson Municipal Airport  is a city-owned public airport two miles south of Jackson, in Clarke County, Alabama.

This airport is in the FAA's National Plan of Integrated Airport Systems for 2011–2015 and 2009–2013, both of which called it a general aviation facility.

Facilities and aircraft 
Jackson Municipal Airport covers 112 acres (45 ha) at an elevation of 62 feet (19 m) above mean sea level. It has one runway, 1/19, 5,003 by 80 feet (1,525 x 24 m) asphalt. In the year ending July 15, 2010 the airport had 2,800 general aviation aircraft operations, an average of 233 per month.

See also 
 List of airports in Alabama

References

External links 
 Aerial image as of 22 January 1993 from USGS The National Map
 

Airports in Alabama
Transportation buildings and structures in Clarke County, Alabama